Fabielle Dos Santos Mota (born  September 12, 1978) is a male professional racing cyclist from Brazil.

Career highlights

2005
 1st in Stage 4 500 Millas del Norte, Tacuarembo (URU)
 1st in Stage 7 500 Millas del Norte, Artigas (URU)
 3rd in Prova Ciclistica 1° de Maio - GP Ayrton Senna (BRA)
 3rd in Internacional de ciclismo (BRA)
2006
 1st in Stage 3 Torneio de Verao (BRA)
 1st in Stage 5 Volta Ciclistica de Porto Alegre, Porto Alegre (BRA)
 2nd in Copa Promoson (BRA)
2007
 3rd in Copa da Republica de Ciclismo (BRA)
 1st in Stage 5 Torneio de Verao, Portuaria (BRA)
 3rd in Circuito Boavista (BRA)
 1st in Stage 4 Volta do Rio de Janeiro, Campos (BRA)
 1st in Stage 9 Volta de Ciclismo Internacional do Estado de São Paulo, Campinas (BRA)
 1st in Copa Promoson, Varingha (BRA)
 1st in Stage 3 Volta de Goias, Caldas Novas (BRA)
 1st in Stage 5 Volta de Goias (BRA)
 2nd in General Classification Volta de Goias (BRA)
 2nd in Goiânia (BRA)
2008
3rd in Copa América de Ciclismo, São Paulo (BRA)

External links

1978 births
Living people
Brazilian male cyclists
Brazilian road racing cyclists
Place of birth missing (living people)